Cede and Company (also known as Cede and Co. or Cede & Co.), shorthand for "certificate depository", is a specialist United States financial institution that processes transfers of stock certificates on behalf of Depository Trust Company, the central securities depository used by the United States National Market System, which includes the New York Stock Exchange, and Nasdaq.

Cede technically owns all of the publicly issued stock in the United States. Thus, investors do not themselves hold direct property rights in stock, but rather have contractual rights that are part of a chain of contractual rights involving Cede. Securities held at Depository Trust Company are registered in its nominee name, Cede & Co., and recorded on its books in the name of the brokerage firm through which they were purchased; on the brokerage firm's books they are assigned to the accounts of their beneficial owners.

History
Founded in 1996, Cede was formed for the purpose of efficiently processing transfers of stock certificates on behalf of the Depository Trust Company. The name "Cede" was selected as a reference to "certificate depository". The company is at 55 Water Street, Suite Conc4, New York, New York 10041.

Structure as a partnership
Cede and Company is a New York City-based partnership of certain employees of Depository Trust Company. Cede is a separate legal person from Depository Trust Company, which is owned by DTC Participants, who are banks and brokerage houses, and not employees of DTC.

One reason Cede is structured as a partnership is that each general partner can order transfers of stock registered in the name of the partnership without the need for presenting a separate corporate resolution to the stock issuer's transfer agent or stock registrar to validate the authority of the transfer.

See also
Book entry
Dematerialization (securities)
Direct holding system

References

Companies based in New York City
Financial services companies based in New York City